Dieter Kramer (born 12 April 1959) is a retired German football player. He spent three seasons in the Bundesliga with Hamburger SV and VfL Bochum.

Honours
 UEFA Cup finalist: 1981–82
 Bundesliga champion: 1981–82

References

External links
 

1959 births
Living people
German footballers
Fortuna Düsseldorf II players
SC Preußen Münster players
Hamburger SV players
VfL Bochum players
VfL Bochum II players
Bundesliga players
2. Bundesliga players
Association football midfielders
20th-century German people